Sourvein is an American sludge metal band that formed in Cape Fear, North Carolina during 1993. The band has released four full-length albums, three EPs, and various 7" splits.

Discography
Split with Buzzoven (Mudflap, 1995)
He's No Good to Me Dead split with Negative Reaction, Grief, Subsanity, and Bongzilla  (Game Two, 1998)
s/t  aka Salvation (Game Two, 1999)Will to Mangle (Southern Lord, 2002)
Split with Rabies Caste (Dada Drumming, 2004)Emerald Vulture EP (This Dark Reign, 2005)
Split with Church of Misery (Dada Drumming, 2006)
Split with Church of Misery (Calculon, 2006)Ghetto Angel EP (This Dark Reign, 2007)Imperial Bastard EP (Candlelight, 2008)Heavyweight Black split with Blood Island Raiders (Calculon, 2009)Black Fangs'' (Candlelight Records, 2011)
Split with Coffins (2012)
Split with Graves at Sea (Seventh Rule, 2014)
Aquatic Occult (Metal Blade Records, 2016)

Band members

Current

T.roy
Jeffe
Lou
Spider

Former
Liz Buckingham - guitar
Sleepy Floyd - guitar
Josh C. - guitar & bass
Charlie Mack - bass
Slim Spencer - drums

Dave Scrod - touring bass
Todd Dystopia - touring bass
Scott Renner - touring bass
Reed Mullin - recording drums

References

External links
Encyclopaedia Metallum page

American sludge metal musical groups
American doom metal musical groups
Musical groups established in 1993
Heavy metal musical groups from North Carolina
Southern Lord Records artists
Candlelight Records albums